Ambrosiaster or Pseudo-Ambrose is the name given to the unknown author of a commentary on the epistles of Saint Paul, written some time between 366 and 384AD. This commentary was erroneously attributed for a long time to St. Ambrose, hence the name "Ambrosiaster" (literally in Latin: "would-be Ambrose"). Various conjectures have been made as to Ambrosiaster's true identity, and several other works have been attributed to the same author, with varying degrees of certainty.

Biography 
Pseudo-Ambrose was the name given by Erasmus to refer to the author of a volume containing the first complete Latin commentary on the Pauline epistles. Alexander Souter has established that the same author wrote the Quaestiones Veteris et Novi Testament, which had long been attributed to Saint Augustine. Other works ascribed to the same author, less definitely, are the Lex Dei sive Mosaicarum et Romanorum legum collatio, De bello judaico, and the fragmentary Contra Arianos sometimes ascribed to the pseudo-Hilary and the sermo 246 of pseudo-Augustine. They mention Simon Magus.

Internal evidence from the documents has been taken to suggest that the author was active in Rome during the period of Pope Damasus, and, almost certainly, a member of the clergy.

Commentary on Paul
The Commentary on Thirteen Pauline Letters is considered valuable as evidence of the state of the Latin text of Paul's epistles before the appearance of the Vulgate of Jerome, and as an example of Pauline interpretation prior to Augustine of Hippo. It was traditionally ascribed to Ambrose, but in 1527, Erasmus threw doubt on the accuracy of this ascription, and the anonymous author came to be known as "Ambrosiaster". It was once thought that Erasmus coined this name; however, René Hoven, in 1969, showed that this was incorrect, and that credit should actually be given to the Maurists. Later scholars have followed Hoven in this assessment, although it has also been suggested that the name originated with Franciscus Lucas Brugensis.

Attempts to identify Ambrosiaster with known authors has continued, but with no success. Because Augustine cites Ambrosiaster's commentary on Romans 5:12 under the name of "Hilary", many critics have attempted to identify Ambroasiaster with one of the many writers named "Hilary" active in the period. In 1899, Germain Morin suggested that the writer was Isaac, a converted Jew and writer of a tract on the Trinity and Incarnation, who was exiled to Spain in 378-380 and then relapsed to Judaism. Morin afterwards abandoned this theory of the authorship in favour of Decimus Hilarianus Hilarius, proconsul of Africa in 377. Alternatively, Paolo Angelo Ballerini attempted to sustain the traditional attribution of the work to Ambrose, in his complete edition of that Father's work. This is extremely problematic, though, since it would require Ambrose to have written the book before he became a bishop, and then added to it in later years, incorporating later remarks of Hilary of Poitiers on Romans. No identifications, therefore, have acquired lasting popularity with scholars, and Ambrosiaster's identity remains a mystery.

Other works
Several other works which now survive only as fragments have been attributed to this same author. These include a commentary on Matthew 24, and discussions on the parable of the leaven, the denial of Peter, and Jesus's arrest. In 1905, Alexander Souter established that Ambrosiaster was also the author of the Quaestiones Veteris et Novi Testamenti, a lengthy collection of exegetical and polemical tractates which manuscripts have traditionally ascribed to Augustine.

Influence
Many scholars argue that Ambrosiaster's works were essentially Pelagian, although this is disputed. Pelagius cited him extensively. For example, Alfred Smith argued that Pelagius' "view of Predestination he seems to have taken from Ambrosiaster. His doctrine with regard to Original Sin appears to have come from the same source". However, Augustine also made use of Ambrosiaster's commentaries.

Notes

Bibliography
 
 
 
 Bussières, Marie-Pierre. Ambrosiaster. Contre les Païens. Sur le destin. Texte, traduction et commentaire. Paris, Éditions du Cerfs (Sources chrétiennes 512), 2007. 
 
 
 
 
 
 
 
 Moreschini, Claudio, and Enrico Norelli. 2005 "Ambrosiaster," in Early Christian Greek and Latin Literature: A Literary History. Peabody, Mass: Hendrickson Publishers. vol. 2, p. 296-98.
 Mundle, Wilhelm. 1919. Die Exegese der paulinischen Briefe im Kommentar des Ambrosiaster.

 Queis, Dietrich Traugott von, and Augustine. 1972. Ambrosiaster: Quaestiones Veteris et Novi Testamenti. Quaestio 115: De fato. Basel.
 Souter, Alexander. 1905. A study of Ambrosiaster. Cambridge [Eng.]: The University Press.
 Souter, Alexander. 1927. The earliest Latin commentaries on the Epistles of St. Paul; a study. Oxford: Clarendon Press.

External links

 The Latin text of Ambrosiaster's Pauline commentary is included (though attributed to Ambrose) in Migne's Patrologia Latina, vol. 17, pp. 48–536. This can be found on Google Books or at Documenta Catholica Omnia.
 The Latin text of Quaestiones Veteris et Novi Testamenti is included in Patrologia Latina, vol. 35, available at Documenta Catholica Omnia.

4th-century Christian texts
4th-century Christian clergy
4th-century Romans
4th-century Christian theologians
4th-century Latin writers